Yarada is a neighborhood situated on the  Visakhapatnam City, India. It is famous for its beach and a hill road to reach the beach. It is one of the scarcely populated beaches in the city. The area, which falls under the local administrative limits of Greater Visakhapatnam Municipal Corporation and is well known for Yarada Beach.
..Yarada is a part in Gajuwaka Mandal.

Transport
APSRTC routes

References

Neighbourhoods in Visakhapatnam